For the village of same name associated with dhokra craft see Dwariapur, Bardhaman
 
Dwariapur is a village in Jhalokati District in the Barisal Division of southwestern Bangladesh.

References

Populated places in Jhalokati District